There are five main lines of scholarly criticism of Marx's idea of the form of value.

Obscurantism

The criticism most often heard from the critics of Marx, such as Friedrich von Hayek, Karl Popper, Francis Wheen and Ian Steedman is that, even if Marx himself meant well, Marx's value-form idea is simply an esoteric obscurantism, "dialectical hocus pocus", "sophistry", or "mumbo jumbo". Francis Wheen refers to "a shaggy-dog story, a picaresque journey through the realms of higher nonsense." Mark Blaug stated that "the reader will miss little by skipping the pedantic third section of Chapter I".

This type of criticism was already being made while Marx was still alive, as Marx himself reports in a postface to the second German edition of Capital, Volume I in 1873.

Often, Marxists have replied to this type of criticism by restating Marx's arguments in clearer language, or by showing that Marx's theory of economic value at the very least fares no worse than the subjective theory of value (the theory of the util as the measuring unit of exchange).

Even so, when he published his very clear restatement Karl Marx's Theory of History: A Defence, the Analytic Marxist philosopher Gerald Cohen explicitly dissociated himself from Marx's value theory. Cohen argued that it is possible to have a historical materialism without a labour theory of value, because the one does not logically entail the other as well. Marcel van der Linden accepted Cohen's approach, noting that "whether Marx's theory is exactly right or not, it remains a fact that the working class produces a surplus product about which it has no say." Marx himself never referred to his own theory of value as a "labour theory of value" even once.

This interpretation contrasts with Lenin's opinion in 1894 — repeated by Johann Witt-Hansen—that with the appearance of Das Kapital, "the materialist conception of history is no longer a hypothesis, but a scientifically proven proposition". Earlier on, in 1880, Engels had written (at the end of Part 2 of his pamphlet Socialism: Utopian and Scientific) that "two great discoveries, the materialistic conception of history and the revelation of the secret of capitalistic production through surplus-value, we owe to Marx. With these discoveries, Socialism became a science."

Substance of value
Marx's argument is that the exchangeability of commodities with recognition of their value is enabled by the common factor that all of them are products of social labour (co-operative human labour producing things for others). Critics suggest that Marx's observations fail to provide any logically decisive proof that human labour-time (work effort) is the substance of the economic value of all products.

Marx's own response
In a famous letter from Marx to Ludwig Kugelmann dated 11 July 1868, Marx became extremely indignant and derisive about this objection, stating among other things that:

Modern debate

In 1989, Simon Clarke captured the essence of the modern value-form debate within Western Marxism, as a hyper-abstract scholastic debate about the form and content of economic value:

The unresolved issue, David Kristjanson-Gural commented, is that "If exchange effects the reduction of concrete to abstract labor, then the magnitude of value is determined not by the expenditure of labor in production, but only in exchange." Although Rubin did refer to "a quantitative determination of abstract labor before the act of exchange and independent of it", by his own definition he lacked any method for determining the magnitude of abstract labour prior to exchange, or for showing how it might influence product-values. Paradoxically, it seemed that if value itself can only be determined with reference to exchange ratios in markets, then value cannot be the sole determinant of prices (a conclusion already reached by Joan Robinson in 1950.)

The Rubin-followers generally abandoned any attempt to provide quantitative measures of value, being content with qualitative and theoretical discussion about social forms, fetishism, Hegelian dialectics, the value abstraction, etc. 
The value-form theorists claimed, that value can only be expressed by money, and that value in a labour economy cannot exist prior to exchange (trade). In that case, the purpose of value theory is about (re-)interpreting the social meaning of market phenomena in a Hegelian philosophical way, and not with measuring the magnitudes of value.
Some Marxists argued, that Marx's theory of value is only intended to explain the macro-level, and is not applicable to the micro-level of the economy.
Some Marxists argued, that since money simply represents abstract labour or a claim on labour, money-quantities can be converted into labour equivalents according to some formula (by relating labour-inputs and material inputs to corresponding output-prices), enabling a comparison of product-values and product-prices, and a demonstration of how value is redistributed by the market. Different techniques have been proposed for the conversion.
There are also Marx-scholars, such as Guglielmo Carchedi, who try to combine a dialectical and econometric approach to understanding the forms of value.

Contemporary Marxian academic research in "value theory" has become a broad area. In 2018, Riccardo Bellofiore, an Italian Marxist economist, concluded from his own perspective that Marx's value theory has "multiple meanings". This can cause extra confusion, because what one Marxist means by "value theory" may not be what another Marxist means by value theory. Nevertheless, Ben Fine and Alfredo Saad-Filho, commenting on contemporary Marxist economics, say that:

The old Marxist theory was held together by the philosophy of dialectical materialism, but in the new academic Marxism of the West, "value theory" is said to be the unifying factor. The unresolved issue then is, whether value theory really can be the unifying factor, if there are a large number of different and competing Marxist interpretations of value, with many different flavors, tastes and preferences, and pitched at many different levels of academic abstraction. Already in 1951, when he had tried to create firm conceptual foundations for value studies, the anthropologist Clyde Kluckhohn concluded that the task was exceedingly difficult, if not an impossible venture:

Sub-theme
A "sub-theme" of this academic controversy concerns the issue of whether concepts like abstract labour or the value-form are "historically specific" categories or "transhistorical" categories. For example, Massimo de Angelis and Christopher J. Arthur claim that abstract labour is a "specifically capitalist category", which has no transhistorical validity in different modes of production. According to Karl Korsch's "principle of historical specification", "Marx comprehends all things social in terms of a definite historical epoch."

Marx himself said that the abstract category of labour ("labour in general", or "labour as such", i.e. labour considered with indifference to its particular forms) expresses "an immeasurably ancient relation valid in all forms of society" (or "an ancient relation existing in all forms of society"); but, he went on to say, only in modern bourgeois society (as exemplified e.g. by the United States) is this category fully realized in practice. Because only there does a system of price-equations exist within a universal market, which can really and practically reduce the valuation of all forms and quantities of labour uniformly to sums of money, so that any kind of labour becomes an interchangeable, tradeable good or "input" with a known price tag - and is also practically treated as such. In other words, abstract labour for Marx was not a fixed, immutable and static category, which fell out of the air one day circa 1750, but an historically evolving category.

If each social category was uniquely and exclusively applicable to only one specific stage of history, it would be impossible to understand the transition from one historical stage to another stage, or to understand human progress through different epochs. Marx does not say that trans-historical categories are not valid, but instead that historical categories which are applicable only to a particular epoch in human history should not be generalized or eternalized, "as if" they are everlasting trans-historical realities. Phenomena ought to be understood in their appropriate specificity, for the sake of valid generalizations.

If current transitory realities are treated as eternal in the imagination, it appears as if they are immutable and cannot change anymore (a conservative ideology), but that overlooks the very things which are changing. This leads to the confusion of analytical constants and variables, with constants and variables in the real world (ultimately, almost nothing in the universe stays constant, although for humans there are constants "for all intents and purposes").

Long before commercial trade emerged, when subsistence hunters, gatherers and farmers had to judge how much time and work it would take to obtain food, they were already compelled to think abstractly and value the allocation of their labour time – giving rise to the first numerical expressions. They had count and compare to survive, because their time and resources were limited, though obviously their valuations differed from the capitalist methods and concepts in use today. Even if they were not aware of the necessary proportions for the allocation of labour time by the clan, tribe, community etc., they were certainly confronted with its effects. Namely, if they did it wrong, their own people died. So they learnt soon enough from experience, to avoid all the worst mis-allocations of labour - they wanted to stay alive, and prosper. Modern research provides evidence that some animals, too, exhibit at least a rudimentary ability for numerical abstraction and a sense of numerical proportion, suggesting it is necessary for survival.

In this sense, Marx comments that:

"Value", Marx said, "does not have its description branded on its forehead: it rather transforms every product into a social hieroglyphic. Later on, men try to decipher the hieroglyphic, to get behind the secret of their own social product..." Thus, for example, archaeologist Marc Van de Mieroop comments about the Sumerian economy of ancient Mesopotamia as follows:

 
 
On the basis of their input/output and labour accounting, the Sumerian accountants, particularly from the Ur III period, were evidently able to estimate, in quantitatively accurate terms, how much labour it would take to produce a certain quantity of output, and therefore how many workers were needed for a given interval of time.

According to archaeologist Robert K. Englund, "The concept of value equivalency was a secure element in Babylonian accounting by at least the time of the sales contracts of the ED IIIa (Fara) period, c. 2600 BC"; the formation and use of grain product equivalencies was "an important step in the direction of general value equivalencies, best attested for in the Ur III period for silver, but then still generally applicable for other commodities such as grain or fish, including finally also labor time."

Labour historian Jan Lucassen states that the first wages were paid to soldiers employed by early states 5,000 years ago, the first labour markets emerged between 2,000 and 1,000 BC (when temple officials began to subcontract labour), and waged workers were being paid with coins since about 600 BC. Already 2,000 years ago, workers could be paid for a specific part of a working day with coin.

The significance of such historical and archaeological data about the evolution of abstract labour and value is denied by many Marxists, because, according to their idea of "historical specificity", capitalism is capitalism only if there is capitalism, and value is exclusively a creation of capitalism.

Rubin
Since 1972, when Isaac Rubin's book was republished in translation, the Western Marxist value-form controversy has continued for nearly half a century. Different schools of thought have emerged, without however reaching a definite solution amenable to all. However, in reality, the intellectual controversy has much deeper historical roots. As Rubin himself stated, "All post-Ricardian political economy revolved around the question of the relation between production price and labor-value. Answering this question was an historic task for economic thought. In Marx's view, the particular merit of his theory of value was that it gave a solution to this problem."

Rubin's claim was that, in Marx's view, the labor theory of value and the theory of production prices represent "two logical stages or degrees of abstraction from the same economic phenomena" instead of being two models that contradict each other. The next problem however was, that Rubin's vague "levels of abstraction" interpretation never clarified what exactly this means in verifiable and quantifiable scientific terms. And therefore, critics argue, Rubin's alleged "solution" is no scientifically acceptable solution at all, of the problem of the relationship between production prices and labour-values—it is just a "definition".

Final concept
In Marx's finished theory of value, the "value" of a commodity turns out to be the social valuation of its average, current replacement cost in labour time (a synchronic economic reproduction cost) but this particular labour requirement turns out to be quite a different quantity than either "labour embodied" in production (the actual worktime performed to make the commodity) or "labour commanded" in exchange (how much worktime can be purchased, on average, for the money-price of the commodity). That is a logical consequence of Marx's theory of market value and production prices. It remains true, however, that if we want to estimate or measure this average quantity empirically, as a statistic, this requires reference to money prices and price aggregates; we cannot measure average product-value, without reference to the forms in which value is expressed - in order to establish the connection between product units, prices and labour. In this respect, the input-output economics of Wassily Leontief and Luigi Pasinetti's econometric concept of vertical integration have proved to be useful.

Japanese Unoist school
Because of the controversy over the substance of value, the famous Japanese Marxist scholar Kozo Uno argued in his classic Principles of Political Economy that Marx's original argument had to be revised. In Uno's opinion, Marx had narrated the story the wrong way round, causing confusion. The arguments therefore had to be re-ordered. In the revised version, the theory of the value-form is integrated in the theory of commodity circulation, and does not refer to the substance (content) of value at all. The form and substance of value are radically separated. The substance of value as labour then becomes apparent (and is theoretically demonstrated) only in the analysis of the production of commodities "by means of commodities" (including the commodity labour-power).

Some Western Marxists do not find this Unoist approach very satisfactory however, among other things because (1) a "form" is a form "of" something, the form that a content takes, hence form and content are not really separable, and (2) Marx claims that the formation of product values is an outcome of both the "economy of labour-time" and "the economy of trade" working in tandem. When a product is produced, it has a value; we can say that it requires a certain amount of labour to produce it, supply it or replace it. How much that value is, however, becomes apparent only when it is traded regularly and compared with other products.

Western value-form school
From the 1970s, the so-called "value-form theorists" ("value-form school") have emphasized—influenced by Theodor W. Adorno and the rediscovery of the writings of Isaak Illich Rubin—the importance of Marx's value theory as a qualitative critique—a cultural, sociological or philosophical critique of the reifications involved in capitalist commercialism. Rob Bryer stated that "The majority of Marxists today argue defensively that [Marx] did not intend [his theory of value] to explain prices and rate of return on capital, but gave us only a qualitative theory of capitalist exploitation". In this way, the quantitative attack by neo-Ricardians against Marx's value theory is considered to become irrelevant. The value-form school has become very popular especially among Western Marxists who are not economists.<ref>A good example is: Christopher J. Arthur, The New Dialectic and Marx's 'Capital. Leiden: Brill, 2004.</ref>

Supporters of the "value-form school", especially in Germany and Britain, often regard Marx's theory of the form of value as proof of a radical break from all conventional economics. This implies there is little point in engaging with conventional economics, because conventional economics makes quite incompatible theoretical assumptions. Critics of the value-form school often see this intellectual tradition as an "evasive tactic", which avoids difficult quantitative problems concerning the relationship between economic value and money-prices which still need to be solved.

Value-form theory as a special branch of radical theory has been popular among intellectual supporters of Autonomism and Anarchism, although Antonio Negri thinks the theory is outdated now. Negri's theory is roughly the same as that of the Financial Times journalist John Kay, who believes that "The political and economic environment in which Marx wrote was a brief interlude in economic history." Both writers regard Marx's theory of value as outdated, although they still like to use some of Marx's rhetorics. Value-form theory is an important strand in the German Neue Marx-Lektüre and there is also a post-Marxist value criticism school.

Sohn-Rethel
In a text which had a big influence on the scholarly discussion, Alfred Sohn-Rethel examined the meaning and implications of Marx's concept of the forms of value in some detail. He claimed that "The formal analysis of the commodity holds the key not only to the critique of political economy, but also to the historical explanation of the conceptual mode of thinking and of the division of intellectual and manual labour, which came into existence with it."

Marx had noted that by equating their products in exchange as values, people also equate the quantities of human labour ordinarily required to produce them, regardless of whether they are aware of it or not (very likely they would not—and could not—know accurately how much labour the products represent, or even where the products originated). This is a "functional effect" of the trading relationship. Sohn-Rethel calls this a "real abstraction"—it is an abstraction performed not primarily by thinking, but unintentionally by doing and participating in a system of symbolic conventions.  Subsequently, the "real abstraction" is however transformed into a "conceptual abstraction" which, he argues, has very large implications for the further evolution of human thought. It then seems that abstract labour is purely an effect of economic exchange.

Sohn-Rethel pondered the question of what holds society together, when all production is carried on by private agents acting independently of each other. He concludes, like Friedrich Hayek, that society can in that case cohere only through "buying and selling". It then seems to follow, that "The nexus of society is established by the network of exchange and nothing else." This idea however departs from Marx's theory since, for Marx, it is not the relations of exchange (the market transactions) that hold society together, but the cooperative relations of production (governed by property rights), that form the economic structure of society. Part of this labour cooperation is certainly voluntary and freely chosen, but part of it is compelled by necessity since people cannot survive or prosper without it.

What disappears from view in Sohn-Rethel's interpretation is that, in the production and reproduction of human life, people also need to cooperate in many ways which have nothing to do with trade (being a "market transactor" is just one role among others). Sohn-Rethel's radical idea is moreover not even very plausible, since (1) society does not simply collapse everywhere, if, in a crisis, the trading process breaks down to some large degree, and (2) at any time, the majority of the stock of objects of value in society (stored, or in use) is not being traded at all. So in reality, the "social nexus" or "social synthesis" involves at any time far more relations of cooperation than trade alone.

Moishe Postone
Borrowing ideas from (among others) Patrick Murray and Derek Sayer, Moishe Postone based his value-form interpretation on an excerpt of a footnote from Marx's Capital, Volume I, which was incorrectly translated by Ben Fowkes:

Postone alleged that in "traditional Marxism" (such as "Sweezy, Mandel, and others"), the meaning of "value" and "labour" was wrongly interpreted:

Because "value" was allegedly equated with the transhistorical category of physical or material wealth, it became impossible to "analyze the historical specificity of the form of labor that constitutes value" within capitalism. Yet, such an analysis is required to understand "how the value-form structures the sphere of production as well as that of distribution."
For Marx, labor in capitalism "must exist in the form of value" and "necessarily appears in a form that both expresses and veils it." When Marx contrasts social labor and private labor, he did not mean a contrast between the transhistorical category of labor and the specifically capitalist type of labor, or a contrast of essence and appearance, but "two moments of labor in capitalism itself." Labor in capitalism is, according to Postone, "directly social" because it "acts as a socially mediating activity". An adequate analysis of capitalism is possible "only if it proceeds from an analysis of the historically specific character of labor in capitalism"

Postone concludes from his story among other things that "the law of value, then, is dynamic and cannot be understood adequately in terms of an equilibrium theory of the market" and that the movement of history "can be expressed indirectly by time as a dependent variable; as a movement of time, though, it cannot be grasped by static, abstract time".

Monetary theory of value
The suggestion of some authors (such as Reuten/Williams) is that although Marx's alleged labour theory of value is theoretically wrong as stated, his theory can be modified such that, rather than value being created by co-operative human labour, value and abstract labour can be regarded as effects ("social forms") created by the exchange-process itself. Simply put, the value of goods is nothing more than the money they will exchange for, from which it seems to follow, that if money does not exist, value does not exist either. This interpretation is often called the monetary theory of value'''. Thus, Michael Heinrich claims that:

The Greek Marxian economist John Milios also argues for a monetary theory of value, where "Money is the necessary form of appearance of value (and of capital) in the sense that prices constitute the only form of appearance of the value of commodities." Critics of this interpretation think that it cannot be correct, for three reasons:

Marx makes it explicit that "although price, being the exponent of the magnitude of a commodity's value, is the exponent of its exchange ratio with money, it does not follow that the exponent of this exchange-ratio is necessarily the exponent of the magnitude of the commodity's value." That is to say, prices need not express product-values accurately, or at all.
As Marx so painstakingly showed in his discussion of the development of the form of value, the value of commodities can also be expressed simply and directly in terms of a quantity of other commodities, or one referent commodity. To express a value relationship, in principle no money or prices are required at all – that is the whole point. All that is required is the expression that "x quantity of product y is worth p quantity of product q", whether y and q happen to be traded or not. 
Milios's argument can be sustained only if, in the trade of one bundle of commodities for another (as in counter-trade), the bundle of commodities traded is itself treated as if it is a "price". But such a "price" is obviously not a quantity of money. The point here is simply that the form of value, in its less developed state, does not require any monetary expression; counter-trade does not necessarily require any monetary referent at all, although in modern times it often does take into account the cash value of a deal.

Milios conflated the money that actually changes hands with all kinds of possible computable price data for a commodity under various conditions. Effectively, he conflated the form of value with the price-form, and real prices with ideal prices. Milios implies, that only priced goods can have value, but this idea flatly contradicts Marx's theory according to which product-values exist also quite independently from exchange (simply because products necessarily represent quantities of labour-effort).

If Milios's interpretation is correct, Marx's value theory serves no good purpose—values and prices are hardly distinguishable. In all his economic manuscripts, Marx says that at best prices are the "idealized expression" of the forms of value. This view is only logical; after all, prices express the quantity of money for which particular commodities will, or could, change owners.

If the idealization of the form of value as a price is equated with the value-form itself, the whole value-form idea is itself redundant. It is a bit like saying, that the price information about a good is the same thing as the actual money that changes hands when the good is traded. Most people know very well what the difference is; they could hardly afford not to know it.

Value as power
In various works, the Australian phenomenologist Michael Eldred radicalizes the reading of 'form' in the value-form concept so that it becomes a socio-ontological category. According to Eldred, the phenomenon of exchange-value is substantially one of social power. Hence, money reveals itself to be the quintessential, rudimentary form of reified social power in capitalist society. The further value-forms developed during the course of the capital-analysis, starting with the capital-form and the wage-form of value, through the value-forms of ground-rent, interest, profit of enterprise, to the revenue-form of these income-sources on the surface of economic life, unfold the socio-ontological structure and movement of capitalism as a "reified power-play". Eldred argues that such a total ontological structure of capitalist power-play can only come into view, if the whole of Marx's capital-analysis is reconstructed, not just the famous, notoriously difficult first chapter of Marx's Capital.

From a different angle, Jonathan Nitzan and Shimshon Bichler Home - The Bichler and Nitzan Archives also depict the phenomena of economic value as power relationships. While retaining some of the language of Marx, they however reject Marx's theory of value. The power dimension of value relationships is also prominent in Harry Cleaver's commentary Reading Capital Politically.This interpretation also has its critics, the main criticism being that by reducing all economic values to a matter of power, the concept of power itself becomes a nebulous idea, which explains "everything and nothing". For example, Andrew Kliman argues that Nitzan & Bichler seek to define power "in terms of market capitalization". On this view, "a market cap that is 1000 times as great as the average doesn't give the owners 1000 times as much power; it simply is 1000 times as much power." Kliman says that "This identification of capital and power—capital as power—is certainly not correct in a literal sense."

"Power", like economic value, is by no means a straightforward, simple concept. Power is often circumstantial. It cannot be automatically inferred, from the position taken by participants in market trade, what kind of power they really have. Particularly in economic crises, it is often discovered that those who were thought to have a lot of power, do not really have it (leading to political crises).

Subjective and objective
There are also anthropologists such as the socialist Lawrence Krader and the anarchist David Graeber who have argued that Marx's value categories should be modified in the light of historical and anthropological research about how human communities value objects.

Ever since Werner Sombart and Nikolai Bukharin first argued it, Marx's theory of value has been described as a purely objective theory of value, as opposed to the subjective theory of the bourgeois economists. However, Krader argued (just like Mikhail Tugan-Baranovsky and Oskar R. Lange) that Marx's theory of value and the theory of utility are compatible, i.e., the one does not exclude the other; and Krader insisted that value has both objective and subjective aspects. Graeber's work is very focused on how value categories shape human lives, and the direct political effects of that.

To understand and aggregate the subjective preferences that determine trading choices and economic decisions in the real world, those subjective preferences themselves have to be treated as knowable, objective and measurable data. Therefore, even a subjective theory of value cannot get away entirely from treating value also as an objective social fact. If that wasn't the case, then all economic statistics and marketing research would be invalid and useless. It follows that in the real world, all economists always have to deal with both subjective value and value as an objective market reality. True, Marx focused mainly on the overall objective outcomes of capitalist valuations. Individual workers and individual owners of capital could not determine what the markets were going to do, although important decisions by politicians can strongly influence the markets. Yet that obviously did not mean, that workers and capitalists made no subjective valuations or choices at all, or that they were completely at the mercy of market forces.

On this view, value cannot exist without the presence of valuing subjects, it is just that the value of objects escapes from their control, and starts to lead a life of its own, independent from the volitions of particular individuals. Paradoxically, as Marx himself says, the more that producers become dependent on exchange, the more exchange appears to become independent of them. That is, markets can not only favour the interests of the individual, but can also work against the interests of the individual, because they have their own independent dynamics. Market movements can be quite different from what people expected or predicted, giving rise to many theories of market expectations, to fathom how trading patterns and people's expectations interact and influence each other.

More Heat than Light
In his widely-read book More Heat than Light: Economics as Social Physics, Physics as Nature's Economics, Philip Mirowski examined in greater detail the theoretical conflicts between "substance" theories of value and "field" theories of value. He claims that "Marx vacillated between two mutually exclusive labor theories of value", which according to him explains "the incoherence of his attempt to solve the transformation problem".

One theory is the "embodied" labour theory of value (or crystallized labour), the other theory is a "cost" theory of value. "Crystalized labor highlights exploitation and fixes the locus of surplus generation in production; real-cost labor values obscure the generation of surplus and open up the possibility that the global magnitude of profit is altered (and hence generated) in exchange". This interpretation is essentially a version of the conventional neo-Ricardian critique, which claims there is an unbridgeable inconsistency between the value theory of Capital, Volume I and the value theory of Capital, Volume III.

Mirowski claims that Marx, in the tradition of classical political economy, believed that "regular capitalist trades are normally trades of equivalent values" This claim is not easy to sustain, since the whole architecture of Capital, Volume III is built upon the idea that product-values, prices of production and market prices systematically diverge from each other, and can diverge very considerably for a prolonged time – profit-making does not require that commodities trade at their values, and, as Marx himself notes at the beginning of Capital, Volume III, good profits can be made by trading large quantities of goods quite fast below their value (the classical principle of competition). According to Ian Paul Wright, "Mirowski unfortunately misreads Marx's concept of substance."

Capital without production
As the accumulation of capital grows, more and more durable and financial assets exist external to the sphere of production. When society becomes wealthier, the total value of the personally owned properties of individuals (assets owned by households) and public property increases, even if some people own little and others own a lot. Marx was primarily concerned with the value of newly produced commodities, but it is unclear from his theory about the capitalist mode of production what determines the value of a growing stock of durable assets in society, a stock of assets which is neither an input nor an output of current production (except for the maintenance labour for already existing physical and financial assets).

Contrary to a pernicious but popular myth, Marx only provided a theory of the foundations of capitalist society, its characteristic mode of production. He did not provide a theory of the total economy, or a theory of the whole of bourgeois society. That is why, later on, Marxist and critical social scientists were forced to develop Marx's insights much further in many new areas.

The old reproduction schemes of Otto Bauer, Nikolai Bukharin, Rosa Luxemburg, Henryk Grossman, Ernest Mandel and other famous Marxists all have in common, that they assume that the income obtained from the use of capital and labour is either used up in consumption expenditure, or re-invested in production. But this conflates the theory of the self-reproduction of the capitalist mode of production with the reproduction of capitalist society as a whole, and it conflates the accumulation of production capital with the accumulation of total social capital.

Ernest Mandel partly admitted this – he stated that it was an error to think that a nation's resources are simply divided into a consumption fund and productive investment fund, with a zero-sum trade-off between them. There is also an "unproductive investment fund", which finances government administration, military spending, elite maintenance and entourage, luxuries, prestige goods, hoarded savings, speculation, tax havens etc. Hence, if austerity policies reduce the consumption fund, this does not automatically increase the productive investment fund - it might only increase the unproductive investment fund. Inversely, Keynesian-type pump-priming techniques (stimulus techniques) aiming to boost consumer demand, may increase neither ordinary consumer expenditure nor productive investments by very much, if they just enrich the administrators of the stimulus program and financial institutions, and if the extra subsidy given to citizens and organizations is in reality largely spent on paying off or rescheduling/refinancing debt. In a globalized, leveraged economy, even if local consumer expenditure does rise, it does not mean automatically that local productive investment will increase also - the main effect of increased consumer spending may only be to boost imports, and not to develop the local economy.

In reality, as capitalist development advances, the share of non-productive accumulation in total accumulation keeps growing, as shown by capital market data and data on the national asset wealth for the advanced capitalist countries. This means that the overall structure of capital holdings, nationally and internationally, bears very little resemblance anymore to what that structure looked like in Marx's and Keynes's time.

Non-material goods
In value theory, there is also the problem of so-called "non-material goods and services", such as intellectual property (all kinds of texts, data sets, software, designs, techniques, knowledge, inventions, information services etc.). Sometimes scholars refer to "cognitive commodities". Obviously intellectual property existed already in Marx's time, but its scope and volume was fairly small.

In modern times, in which science and education have become large-scale businesses, there is a general tendency to attach a property right and a price-tag to more and more ideas, which are given precise boundaries (See World Intellectual Property Organization). However, it remains unclear what regulates the value of intellectual property in an economic sense. How is the value of intellectual property correctly defined and calculated? Often the prices paid for intellectual assets are not proportional to real production costs.

Neo-Ricardian critique

This criticism (made primarily by neo-Ricardians and post-Keynesians) is basically that all the problems Marx tries to solve with his theory of the forms of value can be solved much better and more plausibly with modern price theory.

Meek
In a 1975 paper subtitled "Was Marx's Journey Really Necessary?", the influential Marxian economist Ronald L. Meek argued that Marx's value theory had become redundant, because all economic relationships can be described and explained in terms of prices. Indeed, what Marx calls "value" can be regarded simply as a kind of "theoretical price". In this interpretation, the conclusion drawn is that Marx's value theory really adds nothing much to the economic arguments, and is therefore probably best abandoned.

Response
Most Western Marxists had accepted the conventional price-theories of economics as largely correct and unproblematic, and just kept insisting that value-theory was a necessary "add-on" to make sense of the economy. Alternatively, Marxists argued that value theory had nothing much to do with the market economics of prices, because it referred to a quite different "level of abstraction" or had a different intention. Rob Bryer stated in 2005 that "The majority of Marxists today argue defensively that [Marx] did not intend [his theory of value] to explain prices and rate of return on capital, but gave us only a qualitative theory of capitalist exploitation".

There was no systematic critique of price theory, and almost no attempt to connect the "transformation problem" controversy to the socialist calculation debate. When, in his neo-Ricardian attack on Marx's value theory, Ian Steedman simply disregarded all market prices altogether (all prices in Steedman's models are purely hypothetical production prices), there was no objection from the Marxist camp, although there were plenty of other criticisms.

Shaikh
In his 2016 magnum opus, the classical economist Anwar Shaikh argues that all the main economic propositions of Marx's Capital can be demonstrated in a coherent way and verified empirically—without any necessary reference to Marx's own dialectical narrative about value, a position proved to be controversial.

Shaikh devised techniques to test classical theories of value empirically, using input-output data, capital stock data, labour data, price indexes and incomes data. He claims that generally the deviation of estimated labour-values from the corresponding observable market prices of outputs is not very great (maximally around 1/8th or so), which suggests that the classical transformation problem is empirically much less significant than previously thought. However, the validity of econometric techniques used to estimate price-value deviations is in dispute. The strength of the econometric approach is that, if the task is to measure value, then it is essential to get conceptually very exact about what value is, in order to measure it, even if the empirical measure is only a proxy for the real thing.

Chartalist critique

An implicit technical and historical criticism of Marx's value-form theory is made by some Post KeynesianStephanie Bell "The role of the state and the hierarchy of money", Cambridge Journal of Economics, Vol. 25, issue 2, 2001, pp. 149–163 and heterodox Marxian economists as well as anarchists like David Graeber, who are inspired by the chartalist theory of money. These economists interpret Marx's narrative about how money originates in the exchange process as a theory of commodity money, or the "commodity theory of money". That is, they believe that Marx's theory is more or less the same as the "barter theory of money".

MMT
The "neo-Chartalist" interpretation of money entails, that the commodity theory of money is false;Tcherneva, Pavlina R. "The Nature, Origins, and Role of Money: Broad and Specific Propositions and Their Implications for Policy", Center for Full Employment and Price Stability, University of Missouri–Kansas City, Working Paper No. 46, July 2005 the latter, it is argued by neo-chartalists, can neither explain the origin of money and credit, nor provide a credible account of monetary phenomena in the modern world.

Chartalists argue that money is completely "a creature of the state"—it first arises as a unit of account for state debts, credits and taxes, and is then gradually imposed on the whole of the trading process in society. If this Chartalist argument is true, then it cannot also be true that, as Marx argues, money originates as a "special commodity" (a referent of value and a universally exchangeable good) within the exchange process itself. The neo-Chartalist theory is known as Modern Monetary Theory (MMT). There exist also quite a number of other credit theories of money which differ to one degree or another from MMT, with different policy conclusions.

The controversy about this challenge to Marx's idea is far from being resolved at this stage, for five reasons.

No consensus
Firstly, there is nowadays no consensus view among Marxists about Marx's theory of money. 
Some Marxists deny that Marx had any full-fledged theory of money in the modern sense of the word, since he never developed any substantive theory of money circulation and public finance; Marx had deliberately kept his discussion of money and bank capital brief, it is argued, because he aimed only to explain the nature of the capitalist mode of production as simply as possible.
Some Marxists, like Thomas T. Sekine, regard the value-form discussion as a purely theoretical discussion with no bearing on empirical or historical reality; its main purpose is just to show why money necessarily emerges from the exchange of products, not how exactly it originates. 
Some Marxists, such as Ernest Mandel and John Weeks, have argued that Marx really did have a commodity theory of money. 
Others argue that (a) a commodity-money theory can only be a "special case" of a more general theory of money, or (b) that it is a purely theoretical/analytical assumption, or (c) that it applied only in a certain period in history, or (d) Marx did not have or need a commodity theory of money. 
Some Marxists think that Marx's theory is substantially the same as the barter theory of money, while others argue it is very different from the barter theory.

So, there exists no general agreement about the exact theoretical status of Marx's theory of money. The core problem here is, that in its evolution across millennia of trading activity, money itself has taken a multiplicity of different forms, and new types of monetary transactions keep emerging, that were previously unheard of (see also e.g. electronic money, collateralized debt obligation, credit default swap and cryptocurrency). For almost the whole history of commercial capitalism from the 15th century onward, currencies were used which were convertible into gold and silver, but from 1971 onward, most currencies have become fiat money (see Nixon shock).

Money's origins
Secondly, the analysis of the historical and archaeological evidence about the real origins of money is not simply a matter of "facts", but also a matter of the interpretation of the facts using theoretical frameworks. At what point, exactly, did primitive money come into being? When is money really money? How exactly do we draw the boundary between a "chiefdom" and an "early state"?

How economists will interpret the historical record of human exchange processes is influenced by their theory of how markets work in the modern world, and by how they define monetary phenomena. The further one goes back into the past, however, the more fragmentary the scientific evidence about the circulation of goods is, and the more interpretation is involved to understand how it worked. It is easy to project a modern understanding of money into the past, even although money was understood quite differently in the past, or money functioned differently in the past, because people were related and relating in a different way.

Disagreement
Thirdly, beyond Keynesian and Marxist theories about money, there is a lot of controversy and theoretical disagreement within the discipline of economics as a whole about money, credit and finance. Representatives of different schools of thought in economics often cannot agree at a very basic scientific level about the causes and effects of monetary phenomena, even if they share the same elementary concepts about the circulation of money. They are therefore likely also to interpret economic developments in quite different ways.

Few Marxist works
Fourthly, as a matter of fact, very few Marxian economists have studied monetary economics in any detail, and there are few significant Marxist works on the role of money in the economy.

SFC model
Fifthly, when economists try to "modernize" Marx's view of money, they strike the problem that in orthodox economics the "macro-theory" of money is very different from the "micro-theory" of money. The way economists think that money functions at the macro-level of society as a whole, differs a lot from the way they say money functions at the level of individuals and businesses. They have one story for transactions between individuals or individual enterprises, and quite another story for the "big picture".

According to Marxist, classical and post-Keynesian economists such as Wynne Godley, Marc Lavoie, Steve Keen, Edward J. Nell and Anwar Shaikh, this creates all kinds of theoretical inconsistencies. To overcome the inconsistencies, post-Keynesian Marxists try to create a so-called "stock/flow consistent model" of monetary transactions, which can explain the circulation process of money, commodities and capital in an integral way. This approach is needed especially because "unfortunately, the finance sector is one of the more poorly measured sectors in national accounts".

Pre-sovereign money
The main objection to the Chartalist theory of the origins of money is that, for the largest part of recognizably human history, economic exchange in whatever form took place without using a sovereign currency, and that all kinds of physical goods (such as minerals, cattle, hides, shells and slaves) were used as a kind of money. That is, commodity money existed long before sovereign currency emerged, and the economic significance of the early state was very small. On this view, sovereign currency could replace non-sovereign currency, only because there already existed a lot of experience in trading with non-sovereign currency beforehand. This does not deny that informal and contractual lending/borrowing arrangements also already existed in ancient times, but currency was not even necessary for that.

Because labour productivity was comparatively low, the surplus product was relatively small and the ability of early states to appropriate it through levies and taxes was usually also limited (though e.g. the Aztec emperors apparently hoarded cocoa beans, and at one time owned a stockpile of some 960,000,000 beans). In addition, large trading houses—such as the Dutch East India Company—sometimes issued their own currency, quite independently of the state (see: Dutch East India Company coinage).

So the ability of tokens of value (e.g. cryptocurrency) to function as money does not necessarily depend on the state at all, even although, in the modern era, money has mostly taken the form of state-issued currency and, after the demise of the Bretton-Woods Agreement is always in the form of fiat money.

Tally-sticks
Neo-Chartalists argue however that, although we will never be certain, for lack of definite archaeological proofs, about the origins of money, the first instances of units of account are debt markets, the so-called "tally sticks" in antiquity. Money issued is always debt issued, and, therefore, the notion that money originated as a means of exchange first is regarded as false.Wray, L. Randall. "The Credit Money and State Money Approaches". April 2004

Libertarian critique

A fifth line of criticism, articulated especially by libertarians such as Friedrich von Hayek and the Austrian School, concerns the role of value in human freedom and progress. Marx and Engels tended to present "value" and "value relations" as negative, alienating and reifying phenomena that cause people to get used by others, for ends they can no longer fathom. Therefore, markets appear to be evil things, and the conclusion then follows that people are better off without them. Yet market value can also be viewed as a very positive thing. Hayek stated that:

According to Marxists, value phenomena belong to the prehistory of humanity that closes with the abolition of capitalism. Thus, for example, Iring Fetscher claims: "Marx's criticism is directed against value as such, not merely against its consequence, capital." Similarly, Moishe Postone argued that Marx was mainly concerned with "the abolition of value as the social form of wealth." In other words, the negative, dehumanizing features of market valuations for workers' lives have had prominence for Marxists, even although Marx also acknowledges here and there that markets have some progressive, developmental and "civilizing" features. Marx and Engels seem to depict the forms of value as an alien, impersonal and corruptive force that gradually subordinates anything and everything to "making money" — and it leads to the reification of human life (and to wars). This opens up a far-reaching and complex theme of criticism.

There are many libertarian criticisms of Marxism and socialism – economic, political, moral and technical. In the context of this article, five points are particularly relevant (whether one agrees with them, or not).

Progress
The first objection is that the negative historical judgement about the capitalist market economy is not objective, because, on balance, the results for human civilization of the valuation of labour by capital have had much more progressive effect than Marx and Engels were willing to acknowledge.

The proof is said to be, that workers themselves prefer choosing their own employer, purchasing goods at stable prices, and owning private property; market trade has improved their standard of living faster than any other method. On this view, Marxists exaggerated the "money-making" aspect of business, by simply ignoring many other human considerations involved in it (Marx wrote almost nothing on civil society and the sphere of consumption).

Value inevitable
A second objection is that Marxists are wrong to think that value disappears when commercial trade is abolished. Here the argument is that humans would simply continue to make valuations anyway, and that goods continue to have value, except that knowing what exactly the magnitude of that value is, becomes much more problematic because a general, shared standard of valuation (expressed in money quantities) is absent.

The proof of this is supposed to be the experience of Soviet-type societies where a very large amount of goods was effectively "bartered" or allocated by government decree. Even if there was no trade at all, however, the Soviet authorities knew very well that the products of human labour had value, and, with experience, planners could estimate fairly accurately how much labour would need to be employed to produce various kinds of outputs.

More generally, it can be argued that human beings as moral subjects are intrinsically valuing subjects, and therefore human relations without values or valuations of some sort do not exist. At best one could say (as Marx did), that the type of value or valuation can change.

Freedom
A third objection is that people can distinguish quite well between the means/ends rationality of commerce, and non-commercial relationships. Therefore, it is simply an inaccurate and false subjective opinion to claim that there exists some kind of "monumental domination" of commercial relationships over people's lives, because that is not true—except perhaps for people who are obsessively focused on trading relationships.

What is ignored is that markets can offer a freedom of choice and development to those who value themselves, and believe in their own self-worth. This kind of argument suggests that the "oppression by economic value" or the "domination of economic value" only exists as a belief or an interpretation which itself can be oppressive.

Efficiency and fairness
A fourth objection made is that without the "discipline" and "incentives" of value relations, it is simply impossible to reconcile self-interest and the common interest in any efficient and fair manner, and achieve sensible cost-economies in the use of resources. Again, this is supposed to be proved by the resource waste and ecological damage suffered by Soviet-type societies.

If people don't have to work for a living, they will just try to live at the expense of other people. But giving people monetary rewards and costs as a framework to reckon with in making choices about their lives is vastly preferable to forcing them to work with the threat of real punishment if they don't.

Trade persistence
A fifth objection is that it is practically impossible to abolish trade as such in complex societies, and that trade could not be prevented, even if a central state authority allocated resources to individuals through some kind of credit or rationing system. So long as people can privately own belongings, they will trade them, if it is in their interest to do so. In Soviet-type societies, trading continued to occur anyway, even if it was highly regulated, or driven underground (the "grey economy" or black market). Since there is practically no alternative to trading, it is argued the only dispute there can be, concerns the terms on which goods and services are traded—whether that is efficient or morally justifiable.

Any policy that aims to regulate or control how people may trade, libertarians argue, represents an attack on their liberty and presumes wrongly that the regulators know better what trade is beneficial, than the trading individuals do themselves (see further socialist calculation debate).

Response: market socialism
Arguing against total statification such as in the Soviet Union, many modern socialist theorists have claimed however that markets aren't necessarily a bad thing. It all depends on how property rights and claims to resources are organized or institutionalized. Instead, they argue, markets should combine with non-market allocation methods within a market socialism. A very large amount of literature now exists on this topic, for and against.

Similar to classical social-democratic reformism, the principle is argued that the more that economic goods are allocated by the market, the more the financially strong will defeat the financially weak, and the more socio-economic inequality there will be. Therefore, it is argued, a more egalitarian society requires both market and non-market mechanisms, to allocate goods in a fair way. In this respect, there are many different possible combinations of argument.

In 1919, in the context of the Russian civil war, Nikolai Bukharin and Evgeny Preobrazhensky published the first comprehensive description of the transition to socialism, talking about "the abolition of private trade" (see also war communism). However, in his own 1924 study, written after the introduction of Lenin's New Economic Policy, Preobrazhensky recognized the persistence of trade in the transitional era. He claimed though that there was a fundamental contradiction between collective planning and markets. This idea of a fundamental contradiction between planning and markets became enormously influential in later 20th century Marxist thought. However, when Bukharin wrote on his own about the transition to socialism, he was much more relaxed about market activity in the Soviet Union. Bukharin and Preobrazhensky were both executed on Stalin's orders during the Great Terror in 1937–38, but their ideas resurfaced from the 1960s onward, when Western scholars began to dig out the real historical record of Marxism. Stalin's general program was to eradicate capital markets and free enterprise completely, as well as bringing almost all independent producer and consumer cooperatives under state control: the abolition of almost all private ownership of means of production, which simultaneously abolished the commercial bourgeoisie as a social class in society.
Ludwig von Mises was already attacking the concept of market socialism in 1920, even before a detailed theory actually existed. This received replies from Karl Polanyi and Eduard Heimann in 1922.
Comparing market and non-market production, Michael Ellman concluded that the socialist system is "an efficient system for resource mobilisation, normally achieving high participation rates and high investment rates." However socialism was "the less efficient system with respect to the use of raw materials and intermediate products." Ellman argued that the evidence shows that Preobrazhensky's famous theory of "primitive socialist accumulation" simply did not hold water. In the end, Ellman concluded that "revolutionary social change aiming to eliminate the role of money and the market economy may well fail to eliminate inequality" and instead "simply change its causes". There could be more or less inequality, or different types of inequality in the allocation of resources.
One of the first theorists of market socialism was the Polish economist Oskar R. Lange who, fairly uniquely, aspired to integrate classical and neoclassical economics in one theory. In Lange's view, central planning by the state and market activity were quite compatible. The Japanese Marxist Kei Shibata was skeptical of Lange's theory and considered Hayek's criticism, arguing that Lange fell victim to the "old economic logic" that had to be discarded. Moishe Postone however agreed that "there is not even a necessary logical opposition between value and planning".
Maurice Dobb published many books and papers on the controversy about market allocation versus economic planning. However, because Dobb was sympathetic to the Soviet Union, his writings were simply erased and deleted (like the writings of most other Marxist Soviet-sympathizers in the West) from the tradition of "Western Marxism" invented by New Left intellectuals like Perry Anderson, Alex Callinicos and Marcel van der Linden. Therefore, very few people nowadays know what Dobb actually said.
In 1963–65, Che Guevara and Cuban treasury minister Luis Alvarez Rom spearheaded what came to be known as "the Great Debate" about the organization of the Cuban economy. It concerned primarily questions about the economic autonomy of enterprises, and the mix of material and moral incentives that would work best for the Cuban production system. An international conference was organized in Havana, which was attended by Ernest Mandel and Charles Bettelheim among others, to debate the theory of the transition to socialism.
 The Czech socialist economist Ota Šik, who appeared on Western TV stations numerous times, originally promoted market liberalization in Eastern Europe in the 1960s. However, he became increasingly critical of the system in operation, and began to regard it as "anti-socialist" and "neo-Stalinist" in the 1980s. He claimed that the existing political system of the communist party had presented an insurmountable obstacle to progressive economic reform. In the end, Ota Šik's "third way" argued for a humane economic democracy: a method for the allocation of resources should be judged not on whether it conformed to a doctrine or principle, but whether it really met people's needs and improved their lives, i.e. on results. In the 1990s, he tried to draw some theoretical lessons from the experience of what had, or had not been achieved. In 1969, his countryman Petr Uhl had published a proposal for socialist self-management and democratization in Czechoslovakia. In 1978, Václav Havel, a leader of Charta 77, published his famous samizdat essay The Power of the Powerless. Havel argued that in neo-Stalinist Czechoslovakia, people had to behave "as if" they believed the state ideology, even if they did not believe it at all, and so, they were really "living a lie". This had, among other things, terrible economic effects, because it subverted the very possibility for honest and transparent transactions.
The Croatian socialist economist Branko Horvat championed a type of democratic market socialism and criticized excessive privatization and oppression of ethnic minorities.
The East German dissident Rudolf Bahro claimed in his widely read theoretical critique The Alternative in Eastern Europe (1977) that "actually existing socialism" had not been real socialism. Subsequently, he became a leader of the West German Green Party, and devoted his last years mainly to the philosophy of spirituality.
One of Abel Aganbegyan's first books was called Regional studies for planning and projecting: the Siberian experience. Subsequently, he rose to become one of the key economic advisors for Mikhail Gorbachev's Perestroika program to restructure the Soviet planned economy, and wrote many books about it, some of them translated into English. In the first phase of perestroika, the state monopoly of foreign trade was abolished; in the second phase, many enterprises could trade part of their output on own initiative, and retain the profits. However, when Gorbachev lost his job, the envisaged Perestroika reform programme could no longer go ahead.
Yegor Gaidar believed that there was only one way to get out of the problems of Soviet socialism, and that was what amounted to an economic "shock therapy" of large-scale marketization and privatization (though he officially denied it was a "shock therapy"). This very radical program would demolish political resistance before the opponents of reform could mobilize and organize. Gaidar argued that "The arguments of Mises and Bruzkus, despite their coherence and consistency, are insufficient to explain the systemic causes of the crisis and death of Soviet communism, as well as the general reasons for its failure in competition with Western capitalism. A more painstaking analysis is required, one based on concrete historical experience."
In her book Sale of the century: the inside story of the second Russian revolution, Chrystia Freeland documents how Russia's transition to state capitalism was highly profitable to a new Russian oligarchy, but a disaster for most ordinary Russians. Ruslan Dzarasov provides an alternative Marxist perspective on marketization in post-Soviet Russia.Zbigniew Brzezinski, writing in 1989, stated that "For the world at large, the Soviet experience, an icon no more, is henceforth not to be imitated but avoided. As a result, communism no longer has a practical model for others to emulate."
The critical Marxist Professor Aleksandr Buzgalin of Moscow State University, who is a leader of the contemporary Russian democratic Left, has tried to bridge the theoretical differences between the traditional communists and modern New Left socialists. He has written some twenty books and about two hundred articles, arguing for the possibility of a democratic, self-managed socialist economy, with a variety of property forms and institutions, and some market activity. Some of these writings, like his classic Russia: capitalism's Jurassic Park, have been translated into English. He was in favour of celebrating the 100th anniversary of the Russian Revolution, which Western Marxists had turned into a "red mirage".
In his 2011 retrospective From solidarity to sellout: the restoration of capitalism in Poland, Tadeusz Kowalik  criticized the "shock therapy"  of market reforms in Poland after 1989. Others however note that in the first decades of the 21st century, "Poland's economy has consistently expanded at one of the fastest rates in Europe". Jeffrey Sachs stated: "I'm not a heartless guy. I'm not a free-market libertarian by a million miles. I wanted a cushion for Poland. That was a large part of my aims and a large part of their interest in me, in terms of what I could get for them. And I did this in a number of ways." In his book Poland's jump to the market economy, Sachs outlines how the restructuring of the Polish economy was carried out.
The leading Chinese economist Jinglian Wu claims that a thorough analysis of planned economy since the 1980s (coinciding with Chinese economic reforms) proves that it is "impossible for such an institutional arrangement to be efficient". Critics, including Chinese New Left scholars such as Minqi Li and Wang Hui, however question what is meant by "efficiency".
The dissident Russian socialist Boris Kagarlitsky argued in 1992 that "no economy can dispense with market relations". But, he asked, " why should we regard the capitalist 'free' market as the only possible one, and bureaucratic centralized control as the only possible form of planning? (...) What people with initiative need is not the market or private property, but the opportunity to realize their initiative. If this can be done through the market, fine. If through some other means, then that is fine too". 
The Trotskyists, the International Socialist Tendency and the International Socialist Organization have always maintained that there has never existed any real socialist society anywhere, only "transitional formations", a degenerated workers' state, a deformed workers state, bureaucratic collectivism or state capitalism, and that the only real socialism is Marx and Engels's own sketch of the ideal socialism. The Trotskyist and neo-Trotskyist critique of the "so-called socialist societies" is essentially that state allocation and market allocation were combined, but this had nothing to do with socialism, even although these societies called themselves "socialist" and claimed to build socialism. Therefore, the collapse of so-called socialist societies in their eyes does not prove that socialism is impossible, only that fake socialism is impossible to maintain, and that true socialism has never been implemented or put to the test anywhere, so far. 
Marxist–Leninists regard the Trotskyist and International Socialist interpretation as supremely idealist and infantile, because the Trotskyists and International Socialists lack any realistic understanding of socialist economics and socialist state management in the real world. The basic reason for this lack of understanding is that, if, as Trotskyists claim, there has never existed any actually-existing socialism, then there is nothing there that can be understood about socialism. All one can do, is analyze utopian dreaming, socialist hope, longing or yearning, or testimonies to a socialist faith, or spiritual sentiments about a "socialist heaven on earth" as ideal or utopian future. Or, one can complain about missing the ideal in reality, showing how the real does not live up to the ideal. Trotsky could lead by command and by executive orders "from above", but he was useless as a team-builder in civil life. When, after the civil war, he was appointed Commissar of Transport, he made himself very unpopular with the trade unions - by trying to convert the railway workers into a "labour army" with draconian military-style policies. Most Marxist-Leninists agree, that the Soviet Union under Joseph Stalin was socialist, but that Soviet socialism was later destroyed, because successive market reforms went much too far, and Soviet leaders became more and more right-wing—abandoning real Marxism. The Marxist-Leninists however disagree among themselves, when exactly capitalism was restored in the Soviet Union. For example, some will say it happened after the end of Stalin, i.e. in the Khrushchev era, some argued it happened after the Liberman reforms in the Brezhnev era, and some say it happened after the Gorbachov era when the Soviet Union collapsed. Similarly, some Chinese Marxist-Leninists think that China is now state capitalist, others think that it remains socialist "with Chinese characteristics", and some think it is partly capitalist and partly socialist. All these different viewpoints obviously cannot all be true at once. It helps to explain, why the Marxist–Leninist movement has fragmented since about 1960, just like the Trotskyist and neo-Trotskyist movement.
A substantive visionary statement of the Council Communists was Principles of Communist Production and Distribution. There was no space for markets in this communist system, and workers would be credited goods & services according to the labour they put in, according to some formula. In general, the Council Communists regarded the Soviet Union as a type of state capitalism, ruled over by a state bourgeoisie (comprising higher functionaries and managers in the government and party officialdom, who had special consumer privileges). Similar ideas occur in the essay "value and socialism" by Paul Mattick.
In his "Real Utopias project" since 1991, the analytical Marxist Erik Olin Wright  has edited and published a series of six books, with writings by a large number of contemporary socialist scholars that explore what an alternative egalitarian, democratic society would look like, and how it would work. The second volume in the series is titled Equal shares: making market socialism work. 
Michael Albert and Robin Hahnel have formulated a theory of participatory economics, otherwise known as parecon. 
The Canadian professor Michael Lebowitz has outlined his theory of the potential for a self-managed socialism in the 21st century, inspired by his experience in Venezuela.
Makoto Itoh and Ha-Joon Chang offer a strong defence of state-directed economic organization. 
Anthony Giddens, Robert Rowthorn and Geoffrey Hodgson have argued for a "third way" between capitalism and socialism. 
János Kornai and Ernest Mandel have argued — for different reasons — that any durable "third way" between capitalism and socialism is impossible. 
Diane Elson argued in favour of "embedding markets in egalitarian social relations, which in turn means exploring ways of transforming the property relations that underlie and shape the current configurations of market institutions."
In their book Toward a new socialism (1993), computer scientist W. Paul Cockshott and economist Allin Cottrell defended a market in consumer goods, but rejected the concept of market socialism, regarding it as "a damaging accommodation to the dominance of the right." These authors were criticized by Geoffrey Hodgson.
The Russian economist Yakov Abramovich Kronrod (1912–1984) argued that public ownership and democracy are dominant in socialist society, but that commodity-market relations nevertheless play an important role in a planned economy as well.
In The economics of feasible socialism revisited, Alec Nove argues for a democratic socialism, combining centralized state corporations, public enterprises, self-managed enterprises such as cooperatives, private enterprises, and self-employment. The advantage of feasible socialism would be, that different ownership forms and allocation methods could be tried out, to see what works best for different types of activities.
Frank Furedi, the ideological leader of a libertarian grouping known as the Living Marxism network, has argued that "[W]e should attempt to defend capitalism from its small-minded opponents" but also "rethink the categories and ideas through which we make sense of the human condition". For Furedi, "What is needed now is a turn away from the divisive politics of cultural identity towards the democratic and liberal values of the Enlightenment. Such a politics should encourage identification with popular and national sovereignty rather than with sub-cultures and lifestyle groups."
In her book Markets in the name of socialism'', sociologist Johanna Bockman argues that "far from a hegemonic juggernaut, neoliberal capitalism was a parasitic growth on the very socialist alternatives it attacked".
In their more recent research, the American socialists Samuel Bowles and Herbert Gintis look at the whole problem from a different angle: human beings cannot exist without social cooperation, as atomized individuals or isolated monads, so the dispute between capitalists and socialists really revolves around the methods of cooperation that work best for humanity. Bowles believes that liberalism is in trouble, and could be coming to an end.
Last but not least, there are also "market anarchists" who believe in free markets but not in capitalism.

All these arguments remain much in dispute among economists seeking economic reform; the debaters still cannot agree about basic concepts of economics, about the possible ways that production, trade and democracy can be combined, or about what factual evidence would finally clinch the controversy. At a fundamental level, the theorists still cannot agree about what capitalism is, what socialism is, and how you get from the one to the other. Among other things, Marxists proposed a planned allocation of resources, without a coherent ethical framework for the evaluation of allocative priorities, and without much understanding of effective management.

During the Cold War era, it was very difficult to pursue a scientific discussion about the issues, because positions were highly polarized. Strong moral sentiments and biases got in the way of objective analysis. Marxist discussion was dominated by the hegemonic Marxist–Leninist ideology, because Marxist-Leninists had the most resources and political power. Either people were "for" or "against", and if they were on the "wrong" side, there was little scope for pursuing any objective inquiry (see also Culture during the Cold War). The effect of that was, that very little progress could be made with the scientific analysis of the transition to socialist society and the functioning of socialist society.

In the cyber-age of the internet, a whole new language is emerging to conceptualize the battles people have with capitalist value relations—meaning that often the old traditions do not speak clearly anymore to the new situation; their precise relevance is in dispute. With the growth of social media, what socialism means is no longer under the control of academics and political elites. For some, this is a good thing: they argue that the academics and the elites never got it correct anyway, only real workers did. For others, it is a bad thing: they argue that at least the academics and the elites had some rational, thought-through and coherent ideas about socialism.

References

Marxian economics
Criticisms of political philosophy